Odenberg is a Swedish surname. Notable people with the surname include:

 Christina Odenberg (born 1940), Swedish bishop
 Mikael Odenberg (born 1953), Swedish politician

See also
 Oldenberg

Swedish-language surnames